Individual event for badminton at the 2019 Southeast Asian Games was held in Muntinlupa Sports Complex, Metro Manila, Philippines  from 5 to 9 December 2019.

Men's singles

Seeds

Draw

Women's singles

Seeds

Draw

Men's doubles

Seeds

Draw

Women's doubles

Seeds

Draw

Mixed doubles

Seeds

Draw

See also
Men's team tournament
Women's team tournament

References

Individual event